Casale is an Italian surname. Notable people with the surname include:

Gerald Casale (born 1948), American musician
Giovanni Casale (born 1980), Italian judoka
Giuseppe Casale (born 1923), Italian bishop
Ignacio Casale (born 1987), Chilean four-wheeler motorcycle rider 
Jean Casale (1893-1923), French World War I flying ace credited with thirteen aerial victories
Jerry Casale (born 1933), Major League Baseball pitcher
Luigi Casale (1882-1927), industrial chemist
Marcela Casale (born 1986), Italian female field hockey player for the Italian national team
Mark Casale (born 1962), former American football player
Nathalie Alonso Casale (born 1970), Dutch filmmaker
Nicolò Casale (born 1998), Italian football player
Pamela Casale-Telford (née Casale; born 1963), American former professional tennis player
Primo Casale (1904-1981),  Italian-born Venezuelan conductor, composer, and violinist
Roger Casale (born 1960), former Labour Member of Parliament for Wimbledon
Rossana Casale (born 1959), Italian singer
Stefano Casale (born 1971), Italian footballer
Suzanne Casale Melone (born 1979), birthname of the American freestyle/pop singer Li Suzy;
Ubertino da Casale (1259–1329), Italian theologian

Italian-language surnames